Happiness is a South Korean television series starring Han Hyo-joo, Park Hyung-sik, and Jo Woo-jin, produced by Studio Dragon. It is an apocalyptic thriller that takes place in a time in which infectious diseases have become the new norm. It premiered on tvN on November 5, 2021 and aired every Friday and Saturday at 22:40 (KST) for 12 episodes. It is also available for streaming on Viki, Viu, Netflix, and iQIYI in selected territories.

Synopsis

Setting 

Happiness takes place in the near future, where the release of a failed treatment drug "Next" has caused a worldwide pandemic known as the Lytta Virus, a.k.a. "mad person disease". Those infected by lytta experience short bouts of insanity and bloodlust, before completely regressing into a zombie-like state. The South Korean Military and Police forces are trying to contain the spread of lytta and Next through extensive investigation and authoritative quarantine measures, while civil rights groups protest against them, believing the infected are still capable of normal human interaction.

Plot 

Yoon Sae-bom encounters a trainee at the Special Operations Unit who is infected by mad person disease. In the struggle to subdue the trainee, she is scratched, leading her to meet Han Tae-seok at a research facility. The facility houses many of the "patients" who are kept under observation in order to understand and cure the disease. It is revealed that the symptoms of mad person disease are first accompanied by unabated thirst, followed by the pupil turning white, and then thirst for human blood. The disease is not airborne, but spreads through scratches and bites, with Yoon Sae-bom seemingly immune to the disease. Some of those who contracted the disease is ultimately able to return to their former selves temporarily. Yoon Sae-bom makes a deal with Han Tae-seok which leads her to secure an apartment in a newly constructed building, however in order to do so, she must be married. She asks her high school friend Jung Yi-hyun, a former star baseball player but now a police detective, and he agrees to be her fake husband. The building is luxurious and highly stratified, with the public rentals consisting of the lower five floors, and the upper floors for those who own their apartment. Class discrimination is evident where the upper floor resident Oh Yeon-ok struggles to be the apartment representative while keeping everyone in check. Yoon Sae-bom meets many interesting and strange residents, forming a close attachment to her neighbor's young daughter.

Through Jung Yi-hyun's detective work, he encounters a diseased person who he believes became this way due to a failed pneumonia drug called Next, which has been widely circulated in order to promote attentiveness and strength. This assumption is later confirmed when a resident member who consumed the drug, secretly sold to her in the building's gym, ultimately became infected with the mad person's disease and succumbed to the illness. This begins the outbreak in the building. In an effort to protect the residents in his building, Jung Yi-hyun and Yoon Sae-bom establishes quarantine rules, while securing the building from the outside with the help of his Captain, Kim Jung-guk. Jung Yi-hyun conflicts with building resident Oh Joo-hyung who seems to encourage destructive behavior in the building. The question of humanity and whether to view those infected with mad person disease as human beings forms a psychological battle for Sae-bom, Yi-hyun and Tae-seok.

Han Tae-seok initially tries to keep the mad person disease a secret, but with more cases progressing and people getting panicked, it is revealed to the public. With the increasing number of people getting infected, Han Tae-seok along with his military team are struggling to determine whether to preserve these people, or to kill them off. Han Tae-seok ordered the complete quarantine of the new building complex where Yoon Sae-bom and Jung Yi-hyun lives, offering them a chance to leave the building before it becomes completely sealed to anyone going in or out of the complex area, however they decline the offer. Yoon Sae-bom's blood contains antibodies that could hold the cure for the disease, which Han Tae-seok seeks to exploit. It is revealed that Han Tae-seok's pregnant wife was bitten by the president of the pharmaceutical company that supplied Next, and ultimately became infected with the disease. His search for the cure is in part motivated to find a cure for his wife and to save his unborn child.

Cast

Main 
 Han Hyo-joo as Yoon Sae-bom
 A member of a Special Operation Unit police squad (KP-SOU) formerly known as KP-SWAT. She is decisive, determined, smart, and does not easily get rattled. She is excited to move into her new apartment, but as soon as moves there she faces a crisis.
 Park Hyung-sik as Jung Yi-hyun
 A smart and honest detective who, for a long time, has held romantic feelings for Sae-bom. They graduated from the same high school. He struggles to protect Sae-bom and other people.
 Jo Woo-jin as Han Tae-seok
 A lieutenant colonel and belongs to the health service command. He holds a key to the infectious disease outbreak.

Supporting

People around Jung Yi-hyun 
 Seo Hyun-chul as Yi-hyun's father
 Jung Jae-eun as Yi-hyun's mother
 Lee Jun-hyeok as Kim Jung-guk, Yi-hyun's supervisor

Extended 
 Baek Hyun-jin as Oh Joo-hyung, a dermatologist
 Han Da-sol as Bo-ram, a mart employee
 Lee Ji-ha as Jo Ji-hee
Moon Ye-won as Woo Sang-hee, a dermatologist
 Park Hee-von as Na Hyun-kyung, a romance web novelist
 Park Hyung-soo as Kook Hae-seong, a lawyer
 Park Joo-hee as Ji-soo, a lieutenant
 Kim Young-woong as Go Se-kyu
 Na-cheol as Na Soo-min, as Na Hyun-kyung's brother
 Cha Soon-bae as Seon Woo-chang, a pastor
 Yoo Ji-yeon as Colonel Han Tae Seok's wife
Lee Joo-seung as Andrew, cleaning company employee
Han Joon-woo as Kim Se-hoon, an intellectual who lives around the world with his diplomat parents
 Kang Han-sam as BJ Kim Dong-hyun
 Bae Hae-sun as Oh Yeon-ok
Hong Soon-chang as Kim Hak-je
Lee Joo-sil as Ji Sung-sil
Kim Joo-yeon as Kang Eun-ji, Seo-yoon's mother
Nam Mi-jung as Lee Deok-soon, a cleaning janitor
Jung Woon-sun as Shin So-yoon
Joo Jong-hyuk as Kim Seung-beom
Song Ji-woo as Park Seo-yoon

Special appearance 
 Lee Kyu-hyung as Lee Seung-young  (ep. 1-3, 8 and 12)
 Baek Joo-hee as Park Min-Ji. (ep. 2-3)
 Lee Seung-joon as Kim Dae-yoon, a brigadier general. (ep. 12)

Production 
Happiness is helmed by director Ahn Gil-ho and writer Han Sang-woon, who worked together on the 2019 OCN series, Watcher. Ahn Gil-ho has worked on numerous hits such as Record of Youth, Memories of the Alhambra and Stranger, while writer Han Sang-woon has also penned The Good Wife, the Korean remake of the 2016 American TV series.

It is the first acting project of Park Hyung-sik since his discharge from military service on January 4, 2021.

The first script reading with the cast was held on May 7, 2021, and filming started on May 11.

Original soundtrack

Part 1

Part 2

Part 3

Viewership

Awards and nominations

References

External links 
  
 Happiness at Daum 
 
 

2021 South Korean television series debuts
2021 South Korean television series endings
Korean-language television shows
TVN (South Korean TV channel) television dramas
South Korean fantasy television series
Television series by Studio Dragon
Apocalyptic television series
Television series about viral outbreaks